Zsa Zsa Gabor (born Sári Gábor ; February 6, 1917 – December 18, 2016) was a Hungarian-American socialite and actress. Her sisters were actresses Eva and Magda Gabor.

Gabor competed in the 1933 Miss Hungary pageant, where she placed as second runner-up, and began her stage career in Vienna the following year. She emigrated from Hungary to the United States in 1941. Becoming a sought-after actress with "European flair and style", she was considered to have a personality that "exuded charm and grace". Her first film role was a supporting role in Lovely to Look At (1952). She later acted in We're Not Married! (1952) and played one of her few leading roles in the John Huston-directed film, Moulin Rouge (1952). Huston would later describe her as a "creditable" actress.

Outside her acting career, Gabor was known for her extravagant Hollywood lifestyle, her glamorous personality, and her many marriages. In total, Gabor had nine husbands, including hotel magnate Conrad Hilton and actor George Sanders. She once stated, "Men have always liked me and I have always liked men. But I like a mannish man, a man who knows how to talk to and treat a woman—not just a man with muscles."

Early life 
Zsa Zsa Gabor was born Sári Gábor on February 6, 1917, in Budapest, Hungary, then part of the Austro-Hungarian Empire. The middle of three daughters, her parents were Vilmos, a soldier, and Jolie Gabor (née Janka Tilleman). Her parents were both of Jewish ancestry. While her mother escaped Hungary during the period of the Nazi occupation of Budapest, Gabor left the country in 1941, three years prior to the takeover. During a layover at Eppley Airfield en route to Hollywood, she made headlines by telling the Associated Press that she had danced with Adolf Hitler twice.

Gabor's elder sister, Magda, eventually became an American socialite and her younger sister, Eva, became an American actress and businesswoman. The Gabor sisters were first cousins of Annette Lantos, wife of California Congressman Tom Lantos (D-CA).

Career
In January 1933, following her time as a student at a Swiss boarding school, Gabor placed second runner-up in the fifth Miss Hungary pageant, behind Lilly Radó and crown winner Júlia Gál. On August 31, 1934, she sang the soubrette role in Richard Tauber's operetta, Der singende Traum (The Singing Dream), at the Theater an der Wien in Vienna. This would mark her first stage appearance. 

In 1944, she co-wrote a novel with writer Victoria Wolf entitled Every Man For Himself. According to Gabor, the fictional story was derived, in small part, from Gabor's life experiences. The book was subsequently bought by an American magazine. In 1949, Gabor declined an offer to play the leading role in a film version of the classic book Lady Chatterley's Lover. According to the Cedar Rapids Gazette, she turned down the role of Lady Chatterley due to the story's controversial theme.

Her more serious film acting credits include Moulin Rouge, Lovely to Look At, and We're Not Married!, all from 1952, and 1953's Lili. In 1958, she ran the gamut of moviemaking, from Touch of Evil to the camp oddity Queen of Outer Space. Later, she appeared in such films as Won Ton Ton, the Dog Who Saved Hollywood (1976) and Frankenstein's Great Aunt Tillie (1984). She did cameos for A Nightmare on Elm Street 3: Dream Warriors (1987), The Beverly Hillbillies (1993), and A Very Brady Sequel (1996), as well as voicing a character in the animated Happily Ever After (1990).

She was also a regular guest on television shows, appearing with Milton Berle, Jack Paar, Johnny Carson, Howard Stern, David Frost, Arsenio Hall, Phil Donahue, and Joan Rivers. She was a guest on the Bob Hope specials, the Dean Martin Roasts, Hollywood Squares, Rowan & Martin's Laugh-In, and It's Garry Shandling's Show. In 1968, she appeared in the role of Minerva on an episode of Batman, becoming the show's final "special guest villain" before it was cancelled. In 1973, she was the guest roastee on The Dean Martin Celebrity Roast.
She appeared on Late Night with David Letterman in 1987, where she told host David Letterman about her blind date with Henry Kissinger, which was arranged by Richard Nixon. 

Author Gerold Frank, who helped Gabor write her autobiography in 1960, described his impressions of her:

Zsa Zsa is unique. She's a woman from the court of Louis XV who has somehow managed to live in the 20th century, undamaged by the PTA ... She says she wants to be all the Pompadours and Du Barrys of history rolled into one, but she also says, "I always goof. I pay all my own bills. ... I want to choose the man. I do not permit men to choose me."

In his autobiography, television host Merv Griffin, who was known to spend time with Gabor's younger sister Eva socially, wrote of the Gabor sisters' arrival in New York and Hollywood: 
All these years later, it's hard to describe the phenomenon of the three glamorous Gabor girls and their ubiquitous mother. They burst onto the society pages and into the gossip columns so suddenly, and with such force, it was as if they'd been dropped out of the sky.

In 1998, film historian Neal Gabler called her kind of celebrity "The Zsa Zsa Factor".

Personal life

Gabor was married nine times. She was divorced seven times, and one marriage was annulled. She wrote in her autobiography,
All in all — I love being married … I love the companionship, I love cooking for a man (simple things like chicken soup and my special Dracula's goulash from Hungary), and spending all my time with a man. Of course I love being in love — but it is marriage that really fulfills me. But not in every case.

Her husbands, in chronological order, were:
 Burhan Belge (May 17, 1935December 4, 1941; divorced)
 Conrad Hilton (April 10, 1942 – October 28, 1947; divorced)
"Conrad's decision to change my name from Zsa Zsa to Georgia symbolized everything my marriage to him would eventually become. My Hungarian roots were to be ripped out and my background ignored. ... I soon discovered that my marriage to Conrad meant the end of my freedom. My own needs were completely ignored: I belonged to Conrad".
 George Sanders (April 2, 1949 – April 2, 1954; divorced)
 Herbert Hutner (November 5, 1962 – March 3, 1966; divorced)
"Herbert took away my will to work. With his kindness and generosity, he almost annihilated my drive. I have always been the kind of woman who could never be satisfied by money — only excitement and achievement".
 Joshua S. Cosden Jr. (March 9, 1966 – October 18, 1967; divorced)
 Jack Ryan (January 21, 1975 – August 24, 1976; divorced)
 Michael O'Hara (August 27, 1976 – 30 November 1982; divorced)
 Felipe de Alba (April 13–14, 1983; annulled)
 Frédéric Prinz von Anhalt (August 14, 1986 – December 18, 2016; her death)

Gabor's divorces inspired her to make numerous quotable puns and innuendos about her marital (and extramarital) history. She commented: "I am a marvelous housekeeper: Every time I leave a man I keep his house." When asked how many husbands she had had, she used to say: “You mean other than my own?” Gabor dated German composer Willy Schmidt-Gentner and Dominican diplomat Porfirio Rubirosa. She also claimed to have had a sexual encounter with her stepson, Nicky.

In 1970, Gabor purchased a nearly 9,000-square-foot Hollywood Regency-style home in Bel Air. It was originally built for Howard Hughes in 1955 and featured a copper French style roof.

Gabor's only child, daughter Constance Francesca Hilton, was born on March 10, 1947. According to Gabor's 1991 autobiography, One Lifetime Is Not Enough, her pregnancy resulted from rape by then-husband Conrad Hilton. She was the only Gabor sister who had a child. In 2005, a lawsuit was filed accusing Constance of larceny and fraud. She allegedly forged her mother's signature to get a US$2 million loan by using her mother's Bel Air house as collateral. However, the Los Angeles County Superior Court, Santa Monica, threw out the case due to Gabor's failure to appear in court, or to sign an affidavit that she indeed was a co-plaintiff on the original lawsuit filed by her husband, Frédéric von Anhalt. Francesca Hilton died in 2015 at the age of 67 from a stroke. Gabor's husband never told her about her daughter's death, out of concern for her physical and emotional state.

Gabor and her last husband, Frédéric Prinz von Anhalt, adopted at least ten adult men who paid them a fee of up to $2 million to legally become descendants of Princess Marie-Auguste of Anhalt. Prinz von Anhalt had himself paid Marie-Auguste to adopt him when he was 36 years old.

While Gabor's parents were Jewish, she was a practicing Catholic.

Legal and financial difficulties
On June 14, 1989, in Beverly Hills, California, Gabor was accused of slapping the face of Beverly Hills police officer Paul Kramer when he stopped her for a traffic violation at 8551 Olympic Boulevard. At trial three months later, a jury convicted her of slapping Kramer. They also found her guilty of driving without a license and possessing an open container of alcohol—a flask of Jack Daniel's—in her $215,000 Rolls-Royce, but acquitted her of the charge of disobeying Kramer when she drove away from the traffic stop. On October 25, 1989, Beverly Hills Municipal Judge Charles G. Rubin sentenced Gabor to serve three days in jail, to pay fines and restitution totaling $12,937, to perform 120 hours of community service, and to undergo a psychiatric evaluation. On June 14, 1990, Gabor dropped her conviction appeal and agreed to serve her sentence. However, she refused to take part in community service and served three days in jail from July 27 to July 30, 1990.

Gabor had a long-running feud with German-born actress Elke Sommer, that began in 1984 when both appeared on Circus of the Stars, and escalated into a multimillion-dollar libel suit by 1993. The suit resulted in an order for Gabor and her husband to pay Sommer $3.3 million in general and punitive damages.

On January 25, 2009, the Associated Press reported that her attorney stated that forensic accountants determined that Gabor may have lost as much as $10 million invested in Bernie Madoff's company, possibly through a third-party money manager.

Later life and health
On November 27, 2002, Gabor was a front seat passenger in an automobile crash on Sunset Boulevard, Los Angeles, from which she remained partially paralyzed and reliant on a wheelchair for mobility. She survived strokes in 2005 and 2007 and underwent surgeries. In 2010, she fractured her hip and underwent a successful hip replacement.

In August 2010, Gabor was admitted to Ronald Reagan UCLA Medical Center in serious condition and received last rites from a Catholic priest.

In 2011, her right leg was amputated above the knee to save her life from an infection. She was hospitalized again in 2011 for a number of emergencies, falling into a coma.

On February 8, 2016, two days after her 99th birthday, Gabor was rushed to hospital after suffering from breathing difficulties. She was diagnosed with a feeding tube-related lung infection and was scheduled to undergo surgery to have her feeding tube removed.

In April 2016, it was reported that Prinz von Anhalt was arranging to move with Gabor to Hungary in time for her hundredth birthday in 2017, in accordance with her wishes that she return to the country and spend the rest of her life there.

Death
While in a coma, Gabor died from cardiac arrest at Ronald Reagan UCLA Medical Center on December 18, 2016, at the age of 99. On her death certificate, coronary artery disease and cerebrovascular disease are listed as contributing causes. She had been on life support for the previous five years.

Her funeral was held on December 30 in a Catholic ceremony at the Church of the Good Shepherd in Beverly Hills, where around 100 mourners attended. Her ashes, placed in a gold rectangular box, were interred at the Westwood Village Memorial Park Cemetery; in July 2021, Prinz von Anhalt had them reinterred in the artists' section of Kerepesi Cemetery in Budapest in order to fulfil her wish to return to Hungary. He said that the remains were transported in their own first-class airline seat.

Filmography

Film

Television

Theatre

Notes

See also
 Gabor sisters

References

Further reading
 
 
  (An abridged audio-cassette of the book, read by Gabor and produced by Susan E. Perrin, was published by Simon & Schuster in 1991.)

External links

 
 
 
 Life With Zsa Zsa Gabor: Rare Photos, 1951; slideshow by Life Magazine

1917 births
2016 deaths
20th-century American actresses
20th-century Hungarian actresses
Actresses from Budapest
Age controversies
American amputees
American film actresses
American people of Austrian-Jewish descent
American people of Hungarian-Jewish descent
American Roman Catholics
American socialites
American stage actresses
American television actresses
Burials at Kerepesi Cemetery
Burials at Westwood Village Memorial Park Cemetery
Conrad Hilton family
Deaths from cerebrovascular disease
Deaths from coronary artery disease
Zsa Zsa
House of Ascania
Hungarian beauty pageant winners
Hungarian emigrants to the United States
Hungarian film actresses
Hungarian people of Jewish descent
Hungarian Roman Catholics
Hungarian socialites
Naturalized citizens of the United States
People from Bel Air, Los Angeles
People with disorders of consciousness
United Service Organizations entertainers